The Convention and Statute on the International Régime of Maritime Ports is a 1923 League of Nations multilateral treaty whereby port states agree to treat ships equally, regardless of the nationality of the ship.

The Convention was concluded in Geneva on 9 December 1923 and entered into force on 26 July 1926. The states that ratify the Convention agree to allow all ships the freedom to access maritime ports and to not discriminate against ships based on the maritime flag the ship flies. The Convention remains in force and forms of the basis of the expectation at international law of equal treatment in maritime ports.

The Convention was most recently ratified in 2001, by Saint Vincent and the Grenadines. Thailand ratified the Convention in 1925 but denounced it in 1973.

See also
Barcelona Convention and Statute on the Regime of Navigable Waterways of International Concern

External links
Text
Treaty status, League of Nations Treaty Series, un.org

1923 in Switzerland
Admiralty law treaties
Law of the sea treaties
League of Nations treaties
Treaties concluded in 1923
Treaties entered into force in 1926
Treaties of the First Austrian Republic
Treaties of Belgium
Treaties of the United Kingdom
Treaties of Australia
Treaties of New Zealand
Treaties of British India
Treaties of Czechoslovakia
Treaties of Denmark
Treaties of Estonia
Treaties of the French Third Republic
Treaties of the Weimar Republic
Treaties of the Second Hellenic Republic
Treaties of the Kingdom of Hungary (1920–1946)
Treaties of Mandatory Iraq
Treaties of the Kingdom of Italy (1861–1946)
Treaties of the Empire of Japan
Treaties of Mexico
Treaties of the Netherlands
Treaties of Norway
Treaties of Switzerland
Treaties of Sweden
Treaties of the Kingdom of Yugoslavia
Treaties of Antigua and Barbuda
Treaties of Burkina Faso
Treaties of Ivory Coast
Treaties of Croatia
Treaties of Cyprus
Treaties of the Czech Republic
Treaties of Fiji
Treaties of Madagascar
Treaties of Malaysia
Treaties of Malta
Treaties of the Marshall Islands
Treaties of Mauritius
Treaties of Monaco
Treaties of Morocco
Treaties of Nigeria
Treaties of Slovakia
Treaties of Saint Vincent and the Grenadines
Treaties of Trinidad and Tobago
Treaties of Zimbabwe
Treaties extended to the Dominion of Newfoundland
Treaties extended to Southern Rhodesia
Treaties extended to the Colony of the Bahamas
Treaties extended to the Colony of Barbados
Treaties extended to Bermuda
Treaties extended to British Guiana
Treaties extended to British Honduras
Treaties extended to the British Solomon Islands
Treaties extended to Brunei (protectorate)
Treaties extended to British Ceylon
Treaties extended to British Cyprus
Treaties extended to the Falkland Islands
Treaties extended to the Colony of Fiji
Treaties extended to the Gambia Colony and Protectorate
Treaties extended to Gibraltar
Treaties extended to the Gilbert and Ellice Islands
Treaties extended to the Gold Coast (British colony)
Treaties extended to the British Leeward Islands
Treaties extended to the British Windward Islands
Treaties extended to British Hong Kong
Treaties extended to the Colony of Jamaica
Treaties extended to British Kenya
Treaties extended to the Federated Malay States
Treaties extended to the Unfederated Malay States
Treaties extended to British Mauritius
Treaties extended to the Colony and Protectorate of Nigeria
Treaties extended to Mandatory Palestine
Treaties extended to Saint Helena, Ascension and Tristan da Cunha
Treaties extended to British Dominica
Treaties extended to the Crown Colony of Seychelles
Treaties extended to the Colony of Sierra Leone
Treaties extended to British Somaliland
Treaties extended to the Straits Settlements
Treaties extended to Tanganyika (territory)
Treaties extended to the Kingdom of Tonga (1900–1970)
Treaties extended to the Emirate of Transjordan
Treaties extended to the Crown Colony of Trinidad and Tobago
Treaties extended to the Sultanate of Zanzibar
Treaties extended to the Crown Colony of Malta
Treaties extended to the Western Samoa Trust Territory
Treaties extended to the Faroe Islands
Treaties extended to the Dutch East Indies
Treaties extended to Curaçao and Dependencies
Treaties extended to Surinam (Dutch colony)
Treaties extended to West Berlin
Treaties extended to British Cameroon